Lieutenant general Arzu Rahimov Yusif oglu (born 1 October 1964) is an Azerbaijani politician who serves as the Chief of the State Service for Mobilization and Conscription of Azerbaijan.

Early life
Rahimov was born on 1 October 1964, in Nakhchivan, Azerbaijan. In 1982–1986, he studied at High Military Political General Troops Academy in Russia. In 1986–1989, he served in various positions in the Soviet Armed Forces. After restoration of independence of Azerbaijan, he served in the State Border Service of Azerbaijan Republic from 1992 to 2004, and was promoted from Chief Military officer to Military Unit Commander. In 2004, he was conferred with military rank of Major General, and in 2012, with the military rank of Lieutenant general.

Political career
In 2004, he was appointed the head of Khudat unit of border troops. In 2006, Rahimov was appointed First Deputy Chief at the headquarters of Border Troops in Baku. On 30 April 2007, he was appointed the Chairman of newly established State Migration Service of Azerbaijan Republic. He's considered to be a professional officer, knowledgeable in migration issues.

In February 2012, he was appointed the Chief of the State Service for Mobilization and Conscription of Azerbaijan.

Rahimov has been awarded with 10 orders and medals. In addition to his native Azerbaijani, Rahimov is fluent in Russian. He is married and has two children.

See also
Cabinet of Azerbaijan

References 

1964 births
Living people
Government ministers of Azerbaijan
People from the Nakhchivan Autonomous Republic
Azerbaijani military personnel of the 2020 Nagorno-Karabakh war